Mullaghduff may refer to:

 Mullaghduff, County Cavan
 Mullaghduff, County Donegal